Prince Yawson ( – 1 August 2022), also known as Waakye, was a Ghanaian actor and comedian. He died at the 37 Military Hospital, on 1 August 2022, at the age of 52.

Filmography
 Obra
 Yaa Asantewaa
 Chokor Trotro
 Jagger Pee
 Living Arts Show
 Ogboo
 Man Woman
 Diabolo

See also 
 Eddie Coffie

References

20th-century births
2022 deaths
Ghanaian male film actors